Cecil Dudley Meredith (January 16, 1935December 22, 1987) was a professional American football defensive end in the American Football League. He played six seasons for the Houston Oilers and the Buffalo Bills.

External links
 

1935 births
1987 deaths
American football defensive tackles
American Football League All-Star players
American Football League players
Lamar University alumni
Buffalo Bills players
Houston Oilers players
Lamar Cardinals football players
Midwestern State University
People from Burnet County, Texas
People from Jacksonville Beach, Florida
Players of American football from Texas